The 1976–77 Detroit Red Wings season was the 51st season for the Detroit franchise, 45th as the Red Wings.

Offseason

Regular season

Final standings

Schedule and results

Playoffs
The Red Wings failed to qualify to the playoffs.

Player statistics

Regular season
Scoring

Goaltending

Note: GP = Games played; G = Goals; A = Assists; Pts = Points; +/- = Plus-minus PIM = Penalty minutes; PPG = Power-play goals; SHG = Short-handed goals; GWG = Game-winning goals;
      MIN = Minutes played; W = Wins; L = Losses; T = Ties; GA = Goals against; GAA = Goals-against average;  SO = Shutouts;

Awards and records

Transactions

Draft picks
Detroit's draft picks at the 1976 NHL Amateur Draft held in Montreal, Quebec.

Farm teams

See also
1976–77 NHL season

References

External links

Detroit Red Wings seasons
Detroit
Detroit
Detroit Red
Detroit Red